Shits & Giggles is a 2010 mashup album by The Kleptones. It is a compilation of old songs that did not fit into the previous albums. Some songs date back to 2004 when the album A Night At The Hip-Hopera was released.

Track listing

Surf Mountain - 4:13
Samples - Jane's Addiction - Mountain Song
Samples - Trentemøller - Silver Surfer, Ghost Rider Go!!!
Sick Mouth - 3:54
Samples - Queens of the Stone Age - Sick Sick Sick
Samples - Foxy Brown feat. Sizzla - Come Fly With Me
Gimme Gimme - 4:29
Samples - Black Sabbath - Supernaut
Samples - Rolling Stones - Gimme Shelter
Samples - Rick James - Give It to Me Baby
Flik Flok - 3:42
Samples - Ke$ha - TiK ToK
Samples - Dizzee Rascal - Flex
Saturday White - 4:53
Samples - Elton John - Saturday Night's Alright (For Fighting)
Samples - Billy Idol - White Wedding, Pt. 1
Kool Hunting - 3:36
Samples - The Police - Synchronicity II
Samples - Sonic Youth - Kool Thing
Samples - Bloc Party - Hunting for Witches
Electric Boing - 3:52
Samples - Foals - Electric Bloom
Samples - Nik & Jay - Boing!
Rocksteady Clash - 3:09
Samples - Zoe - Rock Steady
Samples - The Clash - Train in Vain
Dubby Monks - 3:46
Samples - Red Hot Chili Peppers - Funky Monks
Samples - Latyrx - Lady Don't Tek No
Dub It Away - 4:23
Samples - Red Hot Chili Peppers - Give It Away
Kill - 3:11
Samples - Queen - Death on Two Legs (Dedicated to...)
Samples - Kool Keith - Recoupment (Skit)
Samples - Frontline - The Way The Music Died
Smash - 3:42
Samples - Queen - Hammer to Fall
Samples - Sirius B. Feat. HardyHard - Tellievision
Samples - Chicks on Speed - Wordy Rappinghood
Psycho Dreams - 4:11
Samples - Talking Heads - Psycho Killer
Samples - Fleetwood Mac - Dreams
Rodeo Street - 4:02
Samples - Blackstreet - No Diggity
Soundbites - Pete Townshend - The Kids Are Alright
Lung Cancer - 5:01
Samples - Amerie - Take Control
Samples - Radiohead - My Iron Lung
Soundbites - "Drimble Wedge and the Vegetation!" - Bedazzled
Lost In The Ballroom - 4:24
Samples - Sweet - The Ballroom Blitz
Samples - Ali Love - K-Hole
Heydrum - 3:49
Samples - Florence and the Machine - Drumming Song
Samples - No Doubt - Hey Baby
Hit Me With Your Numbers - 3:00
Samples - Kraftwerk - Numbers
Samples - Pat Benatar - Hit Me With Your Best Shot
Lazy Dancer - 3:55
Samples - Silversun Pickups - Lazy Eye
Samples - Yuksek - I Could Never Be A Dancer
Unwanted Whisper - 4:37
Samples - Bon Jovi - Wanted Dead or Alive
Samples - George Michael - Careless Whisper
Soundbites - Reg Presley - The Troggs Tapes

External links
 The Kleptones Official Site
 Official Shits & Giggles album page

The Kleptones albums
2010 remix albums